Phyllonorycter troodi is a moth of the family Gracillariidae. It is known from Cyprus.

The larvae feed on Quercus alnifolia species. They probably mine the leaves of their host plant.

References

troodi
Moths of Europe
Moths described in 1974